Cities Service Station may refer to:

Mount Ida Cities Service Filling Station, Mount Ida, Arkansas, listed on the National Register of Historic Places (NRHP)
Murfreesboro Cities Service Station, Murfreesboro, Arkansas, NRHP-listed
Rison Cities Service Station, Rison, Arkansas, NRHP-listed
Cities Service Station (Afton, Oklahoma), NRHP-listed
Avant's Cities Service Station, El Reno, Oklahoma, NRHP-listed
Cities Service Station No. 8, Tulsa, Oklahoma, NRHP-listed

See also
List of historic filling stations